The 2010 Atlantic Coast Conference men's basketball tournament, a part of the 2009–10 NCAA Division I men's basketball season, took place from March 11–March 14 at the Greensboro Coliseum in Greensboro, North Carolina. 

This tournament was notable for the high number of upsets, with the higher seed winning only twice in the first two rounds, and the 11 and 12 seeds progressing to the semifinals.  The championship game matched Duke against Georgia Tech.  It was the third time a team has played 4 games (NC State in 1997 and 2007).  Duke won the championship game, 65–61, to win its 9th ACC championship in 12 years. Duke went on to win the national championship.

Seeding

Teams are seeded based on the final regular season standings, with ties broken under an ACC policy.

Bracket

AP Rankings at time of tournament

Quarterfinals

Semifinals

Finals

Local radio

References

Tournament
ACC men's basketball tournament
College sports in North Carolina
Basketball competitions in Greensboro, North Carolina
ACC men's basketball tournament
ACC men's basketball tournament